WOAH (106.3 FM) is a radio station broadcasting a Christian contemporary music format. Licensed to Glennville, Georgia, United States, the station is currently owned by Liberty Radio, Inc.

History
The station went on the air as WKIG-FM on 1978-12-04.  on 2003-03-26, the station changed its call sign to WCGN, on 2004-01-05 to the current WOAH,

References

External links

Contemporary Christian radio stations in the United States
OAH